Baden-Powell "Bud" Annand (18 June 1933 – 10 April 1996) was an Australian rules footballer who played for the St Kilda Football Club in the Victorian Football League (VFL).

VFL career
Annand was a reliable follower who played for St Kilda from 1956 to 1962, amassing 106 games and 11 goals. Annand joined the Saints from Castlemaine and became one of the most famous products from the club.  After his final season, which possibly the best of his career, as he polled three Brownlow Medal votes, Annand left the Saints to coach Redan in the Ballarat Football League.

Personal life
As the VFL was not fully professional at the time, Annand had a career as a police officer. As he rose up through the ranks of the Police Force, Annand was transferred throughout country Victoria. Annand spent four years at Redan before moving into the Western District and coaching in the Hampden Football League.

Bud was married to Heather Annand. One of their sons, David, born in 1968, was a contestant on the third season of The Mole where he was the seventh (out of twelve) contestant eliminated.

References

1933 births
1996 deaths
St Kilda Football Club players
Castlemaine Football Club players
Redan Football Club players
Australian rules footballers from Victoria (Australia)
Australian police officers